Carolyn Sue Jones (April 28, 1930 – August 3, 1983) was an American actress of television and film. Jones began her film career in the early 1950s, and by the end of the decade had achieved recognition with a nomination for an Academy Award for Best Supporting Actress for The Bachelor Party (1957) and a Golden Globe Award as one of the most promising new actresses of 1959. Her film career continued for another 20 years. In 1964, she began playing the role of matriarch Morticia Addams in the original 1964 black and white television series The Addams Family.

Early life
Carolyn Jones was born in Amarillo, Texas, the daughter of Chloe Jeanette Southern, a housewife, and Julius Alfred Jones, a barber. After their father abandoned the family in 1934, Carolyn and her younger sister, Bette Rhea Jones, moved with their mother into her maternal grandparents' Amarillo home. Jones suffered from severe asthma that often restricted her childhood activities, and when her condition prevented her from going to the movies, she became an avid reader of Hollywood fan magazines and aspired to become an actress. She enrolled at the Pasadena Playhouse in California at age 17, with her grandfather, Charles W. Baker, paying her tuition.

Film
After being spotted by a talent scout at the Playhouse, Jones secured a contract with Paramount Pictures and made her first film, an uncredited part in The Turning Point (1952); had an uncredited bit part as a nightclub hostess in The Big Heat (1953); and a role in House of Wax (also 1953) as the woman who is converted by Vincent Price's character into a Joan of Arc statue. She played Beth in Shield for Murder (1954), earning $500 per day for playing the role.

Jones was cast in the film From Here to Eternity (1953) in the role of Alma "Lorene" Burke. A bout of pneumonia forced her to withdraw; the role earned Donna Reed the Academy Award for Best Supporting Actress.

She appeared in Invasion of the Body Snatchers and in the Alfred Hitchcock film, The Man Who Knew Too Much (both 1956), a remake of one of the director's earlier films.

In 1958, Jones was nominated for an Academy Award for Best Supporting Actress for The Bachelor Party (1957), and she also shared the Golden Globe Award for New Star of the Year – Actress with Sandra Dee and Diane Varsi, and appeared with Elvis Presley in King Creole (1958).

Jones played opposite Frank Sinatra in Frank Capra's A Hole in the Head, Dean Martin in Career, and Anthony Quinn and Kirk Douglas in Last Train from Gun Hill (all 1959). 

In the epic Western, How the West Was Won (1963), she played the role of Sheriff Jeb Rawlings' (George Peppard) wife. She appears with Peppard and Debbie Reynolds in the final speaking/singing scenes of the film.

Television
She appeared in several episodes of Dragnet, credited as Carolyn Jones in several episodes
 
Jones made her television debut on the DuMont series Gruen Playhouse in 1952. She appeared in two Rod Cameron syndicated series, City Detective and State Trooper, as Betty Fowler in the 1956 episode, "The Paperhanger of Pioche". She made five appearances on the crime drama series Dragnet, starring Jack Webb, between 1953 and 1955. Jones appeared on the CBS anthology series Alfred Hitchcock Presents in the episode "The Cheney Vase" (1955), as a secretary assisting her scheming boyfriend Darren McGavin in attempting an art theft, and opposite Ruta Lee.

In 1957, she had the lead in the episode "The Girl in the Grass" on CBS's Schlitz Playhouse, with once again Ray Milland and Nora Marlowe.

Jones guest starred three times on the television series Wagon Train:  in first-season episode "The John Cameron Story" (1957) and in later color episodes "The Jenna Douglas Story" (1961) and "The Molly Kincaid Story" (1963). Also in 1963 she was nominated for a Golden Globe Award for Best TV Star - Female for portraying quadruplets—one the murder victim and the others suspects—in the Burke's Law episode "Who Killed Sweet Betsy?"

She guest-starred in CBS's The DuPont Show with June Allyson, with James Best and Jack Mullaney, in the episode "Love on Credit" (1960).

In the 1962–1963 season, Jones guest-starred on CBS's The Lloyd Bridges Show, which Spelling created. While married to Spelling, she appeared on the NBC program Here's Hollywood.

In 1964, using a long coal-black wig, Jones began playing Morticia Addams on the television series The Addams Family, a role which brought her success as a comedian and a Golden Globe Award nomination. She guest-starred on the 1960s TV series Batman, playing Marsha, the Queen of Diamonds, and in 1976 appeared as the title character's mother, Hippolyta, in the Wonder Woman TV series. In Tobe Hooper's movie Eaten Alive (1976), she played a madam running a rural whorehouse. The film also featured Neville Brand, Roberta Collins, and Robert Englund. Her last role was that of Myrna, the scheming matriarch of the Clegg clan, on the soap opera Capitol from the first episode in March 1982 until March 1983, though she already knew that she was dying of cancer. During her occasional absences, veteran actress Marla Adams subbed for her.

Her acting career declined after The Addams Family ended in 1966. Sporadic roles in the 1970s included that of Mrs. Moore, the wife of the plantation owner in the miniseries Roots.

Personal life

Jones was married four times and had no children. While studying at the Pasadena Playhouse, Jones married Don Donaldson, a 28-year-old fellow student. The couple soon divorced. 

Jones converted to Judaism upon being married to television producer Aaron Spelling from 1953 until their 1964 separation and divorce.

Her third marriage, in 1968, was to Tony Award-winning Broadway musical director, vocal arranger and co-producer Herbert Greene (who was her vocal coach); she left him in 1977. She married actor Peter Bailey-Britton in September 1982.

Final years and death

Jones gained the role of the power-driven political matriarch Myrna Clegg in the CBS daytime soap opera Capitol in 1981. The following year, shortly after Capitol debuted, she was diagnosed with colon cancer, and played many of her scenes in a wheelchair. The cancer spread quickly to her liver and stomach. Despite the pain, Jones finished the first season.

Even after being diagnosed with colon cancer Jones continued to work while telling colleagues she was being treated for ulcers. After a period of apparent remission, the cancer returned in 1982. In September 1982, realizing she was dying, Jones married her boyfriend of five years, actor Peter Bailey-Britton. She wore a lace and ribbon cap to hide the loss of her hair from chemotherapy. 

In July 1983, she fell into a coma at her home in West Hollywood, California, where she died on August 3, 1983. Her body was cremated on August 4 and a memorial service was held at Glasband-Willen Mortuary in Altadena, California, on August 5, 1983. Her ashes were interred in her mother's crypt at Melrose Abbey Memorial Park & Mortuary in Anaheim. She donated her Morticia costume and wig to the Academy of Motion Picture Arts and Sciences, while a collection of The Addams Family scripts were donated by Bailey-Britton to UCLA.

Filmography

Film

Television

Honors

References

Bibliography

Further reading

External links

 
 
 Carolyn Jones at Turner Classic Movies 
 
 
 
 Carolyn Jones at Film Reference

1930 births
1983 deaths
Actresses from Texas
American film actresses
American soap opera actresses
American television actresses
People from Amarillo, Texas
Amarillo High School alumni
20th-century American actresses
Burials in Orange County, California
Converts to Judaism
Jewish American actresses
Deaths from cancer in California
Deaths from colorectal cancer
California Democrats
Texas Democrats
New Star of the Year (Actress) Golden Globe winners
20th-century American Jews